The Electricity Authority of Cambodia (EAC) is an autonomous government agency responsible for managing and administering the provision of electric power in Cambodia.

Function
In conjunction with the Ministry of Industry, Mining and Energy, which is responsible for creating and operating the electrical power infrastructure, the role of the EAC involves both producers and consumers of electricity. On the supply side, the EAC licenses electric power suppliers, manages the systems of tariffs and fees, and in general regulates the economic environment of power production. On the consumer side, the EAC is responsible for managing consumer activities including managing customer contracts for major industrial and government customers, resolution of tariff-related disputes, and the issuance of warnings and penalties.

The authority is governed by a four-person board. The current chairman is H.E. Dr. Ty Norin. The EAC headquarters is in Phnom Penh.

Penetration
Cambodia, according to the World Bank in 2019, is one of the "fastest electrifying nations" in the world. As of the end of 2017, electric power reached 89% of the populace, and availability is increasing at roughly eight percent per year. Sixty-seven percent of electricity in Cambodian rural areas is delivered by the national grid, 31% from off-grid solutions. The EAC's 2018 annual report said that by year-end 2018, the nation's electricity supply had reached 2650 megawatts (MW), and was expected to increase to 2870 MW by 2019.

Licensing
The EAC issues five types of licenses to producers of electricity:
Consolidated licenses
Generation licenses
Distribution licenses
Retail licenses
Special purpose transmission licenses

See also

Energy in Cambodia
List of power stations in Cambodia
Ministry of Industry, Mining and Energy (Cambodia)

References

External links
 Electricity Authority of Cambodia official page
 Ministry of Industry, Mines and Energy

Cambodia
Government agencies of Cambodia
Electric power in Cambodia
Government agencies established in 2001
Organisations based in Phnom Penh
Cambodian companies established in 2001
Energy companies established in 2001
Energy companies of Cambodia
Energy companies of Angola